Saturday Suspense is an Indian television suspense thriller series aired on Zee TV, which premiered on 5 April 1997. The series ended on 1 May 1999. Each episode of the series was 1 hour long, and produced by a different production company. Some of the noted producers and directors that have produced/directed Saturday Suspense stories are Shyam Ramsay, Manish Tiwari, Saket Bahl, Homi Wadia, Anant Mahadevan, Vivek Agnihotri, Mahesh Aney, Anurag Basu, Deepak Tijori, Ashutosh Gowariker, Raj Tilak, Vikram Bhatt & Ashok Shekhar.

Shinakht was directed by Vikram Bhatt which was about an amnesiac's search for his own identity. It used to air on Saturdays at 9 P.M. It was replaced by another thriller show, Suspense Hour which started on 8 May 1999 and ended on 18 September 1999. It also aired at the same time i.e. on Saturdays at 9 P.M.

List of Episodes

References

Zee TV original programming
Indian horror fiction television series
1997 Indian television series debuts
1999 Indian television series endings
Indian anthology television series